Arash Afshin (born January 21 1989) is an Iranian footballer. He is a former player of Iran national team and under-23 team.

Club career
Afshin started his senior career at Foolad. In winter 2012, he was linked to Lille but move was not done. On 1 July 2013, he joined Sepahan on a one-year contract. In December 2013, he terminated his contract with Sepahan to join Foolad again.

Malavan
After facing conscription problems, he was forced to move a military-owned club. On November 12, 2014, he signed a 2-years contract with Iranian Navy's Malavan.

On 31 July 2015 on his debut for Malavan, Afshin scored the only goal in a 1–0 victory over Zob Ahan.

International career
After good performance with Iran U23 in 2010 Asian Games and also in Foolad he convinced Afshin Ghotbi to invite him to Team Melli

On 2 January 2011, Afshin was called up to the Iran for the team's friendly match against Angola and made his debut.

He was also one of Iran players in 2011 AFC Asian Cup.

International goals

Scores and results list Iran's goal tally first.

Honours
Foolad
Iran Pro League (1): 2013–14

Personal life
He is currently Student of Civil Engineering at Islamic Azad University Ramhormoz Branch.

References

Arash Afshin at Navad

External links
 Arash Afshin at PersianLeague.com

1990 births
Living people
Foolad FC players
Iranian footballers
2011 AFC Asian Cup players
Iran international footballers
Sportspeople from Khuzestan province
Association football forwards
Association football wingers
Footballers at the 2010 Asian Games
Sepahan S.C. footballers
Malavan players
Esteghlal F.C. players
Persian Gulf Pro League players
Asian Games competitors for Iran
21st-century Iranian people